La Porta is a commune in the Haute-Corse department of France on the island of Corsica.

La Porta is situated in the heart of the Castagniccia, of which this is the largest settlement. It formed the gateway (porta) to the ancient pieve of Ampugnani.

Geography
Part of the canton of the Fiumalto d'Ampugnani, La Porta on its spur of Monte San Petrone is sheltered among the chestnut woodlands on the slopes. This most remote and isolated area of north-western Corsica retains the last extensive stands of the old-growth chestnut forest that gave its name to the Castagniccia region (castagna, "chestnut"); the depopulation it has experienced since ca 1870, to 196 persons in 1999, have had the effect of preserving the traditional landscape.

The hamlet of Poggiale, part of the commune which contains its reservoir, is sited somewhat further up the slope. To the northeast the village of Quercitello looks down upon La Porta. To the east, it faces the adjoining village of Ficaja.

Climate
La Porta has a warm-summer mediterranean climate (Köppen climate classification Csb).

History
The comparative prosperity of the 17th and 18th centuries was based on valuable timber exported from the chestnut forests and a leather industry based on chestnut tannins, while the sweet chestnut remained the staple crop of the common people, and chestnut flour was exported, though with very considerable annual variations, which led to uncertainties in the local economy.

Population

Sights
In this compactly nucleated village, the vernacular houses with austere fronts are built of schist, fieldstone and slate, with some stuccoed and painted walls, interspersed with a handful of larger houses of local notables.

The church of Saint Jean Baptiste and its ambitious campanile are more than local landmarks, the pride of the village and the most famous masterpieces of the late Baroque architecture of Corsica. The church was built from 1680 and provided with a facade designed by the Milanese architect Domenico Baïna, which was completed about 1707. Baïna also designed the sumptuous campanile that rises in five stages to 45 meters, and is visible far and wide, finished about 1720. The interior frescoes en camaïeu were carried out in the 1880s by Girolamo dela Porta.

Personalities
La Porta was the birthplace of Horace François Bastien Sébastiani de La Porta (1771–1851), a Corsican soldier and diplomat for Napoleon, and a politician who served as Naval Minister, Minister of Foreign Affairs, and Minister of State under the July Monarchy.

Transportation
Corsican Routes D405 and D515 serve the village.

See also
Communes of the Haute-Corse department
Laporta

References

Communes of Haute-Corse